The 49th annual Venice International Film Festival was held on 1 to 12 September 1992.

Jury
The following people comprised the 1992 jury:
Dennis Hopper (head of jury)
Jirí Menzel (head of jury)
Gianni Amelio
Anne Brochet
Neil Jordan
Hanif Kureishi
Ennio Morricone
Michael Ritchie
Jacques Siclier
Fernando E. Solanas
Sheila Whitaker

Official selection

In competition

Autonomous sections

Venice International Film Critics' Week
The following feature films were selected to be screened as In Competition for this section:
 Galaxies Are Colliding by John Ryman (United States)
 Oxygen Starvation (Kisneviy golod) by Andrey Donchik (Canada, Ukraine)
 Klamek ji bo Beko by Nizamettin Ariç (Germany, Turkey)
 The Seven Deadly Sins (Les sept péchés capitaux) by Beatriz Flores Silva, Frédéric Fonteyne, Yvan Le Moine, Geneviève Mersch, Pier-Paul Renders, Pasca Zabus, Philippe Blasbard, Olivier Smolders (France, Belgium, Luxemburg)
 Leon the Pig Farmer by Gary Sinyor, Vadim Jean (United Kingdom)
 Naprawde krotki film o milosci, zabijaniu i jeszcze jednym przykazaniu by Rafal Wieczynsky (Poland)
 Sabine by Philippe Faucon (France)

Awards
Golden Lion:
The Story of Qiu Ju (Yimou Zhang)
Grand Special Jury Prize:
Morte di un matematico napoletano (Mario Martone)
Silver Lion:
Un coeur en hiver (Claude Sautet)
Jamón, jamón (Bigas Luna)
Hotel de lux (Dan Pita)
Volpi Cup:
Best Actor: Jack Lemmon (Glengarry Glen Ross)
Best Actress: Li Gong (The Story of Qiu Ju)
The President of the Italian Senate's gold medal:
Guelwaar (Ousmane Sembene)
Career Golden Lion:
Francis Ford Coppola
Jeanne Moreau
Paolo Villaggio
Audience Award:
Tango Argentino (Goran Paskaljević)
FIPRESCI Prize:
Un coeur en hiver (Claude Sautet)
Leon the Pig Farmer (Vadim Jean)
Die zweite Heimat - Chronik einer Jugend (Edgar Reitz)
OCIC Award:
Orlando (Sally Potter)
OCIC Award - Honorable Mention:
Daens (Stijn Coninx)
The Story of Qiu Ju (Li Gong)
Pietro Bianchi Award:
Marco Ferreri
Elvira Notari Prize:
Orlando (Sally Potter)
Special Prize on Occasion of the Festival's Jubilee
Die zweite Heimat - Chronik einer Jugend (Edgar Reitz)

References

External links

Venice Film Festival 1992 Awards on IMDb

Venice
Venice Film Festival
1992 film festivals
Film
Venice
September 1992 events in Europe